The 2022 Auburn Tigers football team represented Auburn University as a member of the Western Division of the Southeastern Conference (SEC) during the 2022 NCAA Division I FBS football season. The Tigers were led by second-year head coach Bryan Harsin until his firing on October 31. Later that day, former Auburn running backs coach Cadillac Williams was appointed interim head coach for the remainder of the season. Auburn compiled an overall record of 5–7 with a mark of 2–6 in conference play, tying for fifth placed in the SEC Western Division. The team played home games at Jordan–Hare Stadium in Auburn, Alabama.

Schedule
Auburn and the SEC announced the 2022 football schedule on September 21, 2021.

Game summaries

No. 23 (FCS) Mercer

San Jose State

No. 22 Penn State

Missouri

LSU

at No. 2 Georgia

at No. 9 Ole Miss

Arkansas

at Mississippi State

Texas A&M

Western Kentucky

at No. 7 Alabama

Coaching staff

 Support staff

Graduate assistants

Analysts

References

Auburn
Auburn Tigers football seasons
Auburn Tigers football